Bhalchandra Laxman Mungekar (born 2 March 1946) is an Indian economist, educationist, Social worker and Rajya Sabha member. He specialises in agricultural economics and is an expert on B. R. Ambedkar.

Early life
Mungekar was born in Munge village to Laxman Gopal Mungekar and Shewanti Mungekar, in the Konkan region of Maharashtra. He studied at the Navbharat Vidyalaya at Parel and Siddharth English High School at Wadala and did B.A, M.A, and Ph.D. in economics from University of Mumbai. In 1965, he joined Reserve Bank of India as a clerk and elevated to the rank of assistant economist.

Career
He has been Vice-Chancellor of the University of Mumbai and has served in the Planning Commission, the Agricultural Price Commission of India. Mungekar has also been the chairman and President of Indian Institute of Advanced Study, Shimla. And also he has been the chairman of University Grand Commission. He is also a writer, great philosopher and was an economics teacher at Siddharth College of Arts, Science and Commerce.

Personal life
He is influenced from Ambedkarite ideology, and a follower of Buddhism.

References

External links

University of Mumbai people
1946 births
Living people
Nominated members of the Rajya Sabha
20th-century Indian economists
People from Sindhudurg district
Members of the Planning Commission of India
21st-century Indian politicians
Indian agricultural economists
21st-century Indian economists
Scientists from Maharashtra
Scholars from Mumbai
Indian Buddhists
20th-century Buddhists
21st-century Buddhists
Maharashtra politicians
Rajya Sabha members from Maharashtra
Dalit writers
Indian writers